Nicolaevca is a commune in Florești District, Moldova. It is composed of two villages, Nicolaevca and Valea Rădoaiei.

References

Communes of Florești District